Tim McCann is a former defensive tackle in the National Football League. He was a member of the New York Giants during the 1969 NFL season.

References

Players of American football from Milwaukee
New York Giants players
American football defensive tackles
Princeton Tigers football players
1947 births
Living people